Castleton Tower (officially, Castle Rock) is a  Wingate Sandstone tower standing on a 1,000 foot Moenkopi-Chinle cone above the northeastern border of Castle Valley, Utah. The tower is world-renowned as a subject for photography and for its classic rock climbing routes, the most famous of which is the Kor-Ingalls Route featured in Fifty Classic Climbs of North America.  It can be accessed by a trail that begins south of the tower at a primitive camp ground.

Location 

Castleton Tower sits at the southern terminus of a ridge made mostly of red sand, gravel, scatter boulders, and few short cliff lines. Castleton Tower (~40'x400') shares the ridge with a structure at the ridge's Northern terminus with a similar height but considerable larger area known as The Rectory (~200'x1000'). This second structure is also referred to as The Priest and Nuns although those names are more often applied to specific structures connected to or contained in The Rectory. The La Sal Range and the Manti-La Sal National Forest is visible to the Southeast, The Fisher Towers are visible to the Northeast, and the Colorado River with its associated cliffs lies to the Castleton 's Northwest.

Ascent History 
Among the most popular rock climbing destinations in the world, Castleton Tower has been summitted by thousands.  Climbing historian Stewart Green reports that the number of successful ascents is over 40,000 and there have been so many that "no one really knows how many folks have reached the summit."  The first ascent was completed September 16, 1961 by Layton Kor and Huntley Ingalls.  Their route of ascent is still one of the most popular and carries their name, the Kor-Ingalls Route, and is rated 5.9.  Today there are named routes of ascent on every aspect of the tower. 

In 1964 and again in 1973, the tower was the location for two Chevrolet TV commercials. For both ads a car (along with a female model) was lifted to the summit in several sections using helicopters. The vehicle was then reassembled, filmed by a chopper crew, then disassembled and removed (including the model).

Preservation
Much of the land in Castle Valley is or has been owned by Utah's School and Institutional Trust Lands Administration (SITLA). The SITLA is a state land trust which auctions and leases lands to private interests in order to fund Utah schools and related state institutions. The land initially went to an Aspen, Colorado land-developer with a local partner who planned to subdivide the land creating lots for residential housing. This plan would have eliminated the Tower's camping ground and reduced recreational access to the Tower's base. In response the Castle Rock Collaboration (CRC) formed to prevent commercial development. Over the next two years the CRC, Utah Open Lands Conservation Association, a non-profit land trust and partners were able to raise the money necessary to purchase the land initially bought by the developers and then work with SITLA to secure more land as open space. Thus far  of the land that encompasses the base of the Tower, including the primitive Climber's Campground, have been protected and is now owned and managed by the Utah Open Lands. Please contact Utah Open Lands for more information as needed.

References

External links

 
 Castleton Tower vibrates: ScienceDaily

Mountains of Utah
Climbing areas of Utah
Landforms of Grand County, Utah
Protected areas of Grand County, Utah